Qarah Aghaj (also Romanized as Qarah Āghāj and Qareh Āghāj; also known as Qarah Āghājlū and Qareh Āqāj) is a village in Yaft Rural District, Moradlu District, Meshgin Shahr County, Ardabil Province, Iran. At the 2006 census, its population was 586, in 101 families.

References 

Towns and villages in Meshgin Shahr County